American Pie Presents: The Book of Love is a 2009 American sex comedy film directed by John Putch. It is the fourth installment in the American Pie Presents film series, a spin-off of the American Pie franchise. The film stars Bug Hall, Brandon Hardesty, Kevin M. Horton, Beth Behrs, Jennifer Holland, John Patrick Jordan, Rosanna Arquette, and Eugene Levy. This was Sherman Hemsley's final film appearance before his death on July 24, 2012.

The film was released direct-to-DVD in the United States on December 22, 2009, by Universal Studios Home Entertainment. It grossed $5.2 million in DVD sales.

Plot
In East Great Falls, Michigan, high-schooler Rob masturbates with a peanut butter sandwich. His dog attempts to eat it and his younger brother Cody films the ordeal, uploading it to YouTube. 

At school, an embarrassed Rob meets his fellow virgin friends Nathan and Marshall "Lube"; and Nathan reveals that his girlfriend Dana has pledged to abstain from sex until marriage, despite having already slept with several people. Classmate Scott Stifler threatens to make a move on Heidi, Rob's crush, and Lube has a vivid fantasy about cheerleader Ashley. Rob and Heidi meet in the library where she reveals a desire to lose her virginity as soon as possible. 

At the school dance, Nathan offends Dana when he expects sex after giving her cunnilingus in the car. Rob attempts to tell Heidi his feelings for her but is interrupted by Nathan and Lube, and eventually finds her in the library about to have sex with another student. Shocked, Rob drops a lit tiki torch, starting a fire and setting off the sprinklers.
 
The next day, while Rob and Heidi are cleaning the library for detention, he finds "The Bible", a legendary sex manual compiled by students over forty years, now damaged by the water.
 
Testing a tip from the book, Rob approaches Ashley in a lingerie store and compliments her. She leads him into a changing room, shows her breasts, and shoves some panties down his pants, telling him to shoplift them for her. He is caught and forced to pay for them with his mother's credit card. At Dana's church service, Nathan accidentally broadcasts their intimate conversation to the entire congregation over the PA system, and Dana's father forbids her to see him. Rob's mother confronts him about the credit card charge, and his sarcastic reply that he likes wearing women's underwear is filmed by Cody, who again posts the embarrassing footage online.
 
At a school basketball game, Rob is again unable to tell Heidi how he feels. Following a page in the book, Rob and his friends visit a very experienced Canadian prostitute. Lube misread that the entry was written in 1975, and the friends are disgusted to meet the now elderly Monique, who dies while performing fellatio on Rob, so the panicked boys drive home.
 
Rob finally tells Heidi he has feelings for her, and she reciprocates, agreeing to meet later at Stifler's party. There, Heidi is hurt overhearing Rob shout, "Tonight, I'm getting laid!". Lube propositions Ashley but she turns him down. Her friend takes him up on his guarantee of sexual satisfaction, but storms out after finding an offensive text on his phone. Nathan tries to reconcile with Dana but offends her again. Rob finds Heidi in bed with Stifler, and begins drinking heavily. He declares that "only assholes get laid!" and behaves crudely to a random girl, who promptly takes him to bed but he vomits on her back before they can have sex. The next morning, his mother shows him a video she received of the incident.
 
Rob and his friends resolve to find all the book's original contributors starting with its creator, Noah Levenstein, and eventually succeed in recreating the damaged pages.
 
On the school ski trip, Katie, whom Stifler had been avoiding, is upset she lost her virginity to him. She defeats him at strip poker, forcing him to apologize and go outside naked, where he is sodomized by a moose. Afterward, he bonds with a sympathetic Imogen. Nathan has sex with Dana in the ski lift control room, accidentally shutting off the power. 

Stuck in the lifts, Rob and Heidi reconcile and kiss, and Lube falls off. Ashley climbs down to him, and is moved to tears when Lube explains how he really feels about her. Heidi and Rob return to the cabin and have sex, and Lube and Ashley do the same.
 
Rob, Nathan, and Lube return the newly restored Bible to its hiding place in the library, after Rob has added his own signature. Cody finds an online video of himself putting a vacuum cleaner on his penis which, to his horror, has been viewed almost 10 million times. Rob appears in the video, broadcasting his revenge.

Cast

Soundtrack

 "Oh Yeah" by Yello
 "Something in Your Mouth" by Nickelback
 "Sexy Little Thing"/"Miss Cindy" by The High Decibels
 "Smoke Alarm" by Freddy Rawsh
 "Hot N Cold" by Katy Perry
 "Dance, Dance" by Fall Out Boy
 "Turn It Down" by Sideway Runners
 "Hypnotik" by Roobie Breastnut
 "Beer" by Ace Baker
 "How Do I Know" by Wanda Bell
 "When You Want Some Uh Uh" by Nio Renee Wilson
 "Get Loose (NipJoint Remix)" by Quanteisha
 "Pauline" by The High Lonesome
 "Katmandu" by Sam Morrison
 "1969" by Dr. Hollywood
 "Body Language" by Isaac Hayes
 "If Something's Wrong" by Aidan Hawken
 "Damned If I Do Ya (Damned If I Don't)" by All Time Low
 "Hot Mess" by Cobra Starship
 "Are You Ready" Crash Boom Bang
 "Got Me Some Love" by Keely Hawkes
 "Army Girl" by The Genders
 "Obsession" by Ace Baker
 "Something Wild" by The High Lonesome
 "Burnin' Love" by Travis Tritt
 "Laid" by Aidan Hawken
 "She Can Dance" by Billy Trudel
 "Monday" by Mikey and the Gypsys
 "In It for You" ("Catch My Fall") by The Elliots
 "Heartbeats" by Melinda Ortner
 "Say Yes" by Elliott Smith
 "Book of Love" by Powderfinger
 "Sinner" by Big B featuring Scott Russo
 "Mouth to Mouth" by Kaya Jones

Reception
Andre Dellamorte of Collider wrote, "I can't hate on a film like this for the very fact that it is the fourth direct to video sequel to the American Pie films. If you didn't know what you were getting when you walked in the door, then who's really to blame?".  In his review for IGN, R. L. Shaffer said the film series has lost the original film's "thoughtful and heartfelt tone", and, although this film attempts to bring some of that back, it is "too little too late". David Nusair of Reel Film Reviews gave the film 1.5 out of 4 and called it "...a typically low-rent and flat-out needless straight-to-video endeavor".

References

External links

 
 
 

American Pie (film series)
2009 films
2009 comedy films
2009 direct-to-video films
2000s American films
2000s English-language films
2000s high school films
2000s teen sex comedy films
American high school films
American teen comedy films
American sex comedy films
Cheerleading films
Direct-to-video comedy films
Direct-to-video sequel films
Films about virginity
Films set in Michigan
Films shot in Vancouver
Films directed by John Putch
Films produced by Mike Elliott
Universal Pictures direct-to-video films